Robyn Young (born 19 December 2000) is a Swazi swimmer. She competed in the women's 50 metre backstroke event at the 2017 World Aquatics Championships. In 2018, she competed in the girls' 50 metre backstroke event at the 2018 Summer Youth Olympics held in Buenos Aires, Argentina. She also competed in the girls' 100 metre backstroke and girls' 100 metre freestyle events. In 2021, she competed in the women's 50 metre freestyle event at the 2020 Summer Olympics held in Tokyo, Japan.

References

External links
 

2000 births
Living people
Swazi female swimmers
Place of birth missing (living people)
Swimmers at the 2018 Summer Youth Olympics
Female backstroke swimmers
Swazi female freestyle swimmers
Swimmers at the 2020 Summer Olympics
Olympic swimmers of Eswatini